TPNW may refer to:  

 Treaty on the Prohibition of Nuclear Weapons, an international treaty prohibiting nuclear weapons, signed in 2017 and entered into force 22 January 2021.
 Tourism Partnership North Wales.
 The Standard Carrier Alpha Code for Triple A Logistics.